Julius Korir (born April 21, 1960) is a former Kenyan athlete, who won the 3.000 m steeplechase at the 1984 Summer Olympics.

Born in Nandi, Kenya, Julius Korir rose into the international athletics scene in 1982, when he surprisingly won the gold medal at the Commonwealth Games.

Korir improved his times during the 1983 season, but finished only seventh at the first World Championships. Korir continued to improve in 1984 and after winning his semi-final at the Los Angeles Olympics, he established himself as a serious contender for the gold medal. In the Olympic final, Korir was always with the leaders, and when he started his sprint for home with just over half a lap remaining, the rest of the field were unable to respond.

Korir missed the 1985 season due to injury, and although he competed for several more years, he never again represented his country at a major international championships.

Achievements

External links
 

1960 births
Living people
Olympic athletes of Kenya
Olympic gold medalists for Kenya
Athletes (track and field) at the 1982 Commonwealth Games
Commonwealth Games gold medallists for Kenya
Kenyan male middle-distance runners
Athletes (track and field) at the 1984 Summer Olympics
Commonwealth Games medallists in athletics
Kenyan male steeplechase runners
Medalists at the 1984 Summer Olympics
Olympic gold medalists in athletics (track and field)
Kenyan male cross country runners
Medallists at the 1982 Commonwealth Games